An authorised firearms officer (AFO) is a British police officer who is authorised and trained to carry and use firearms. The designation is significant because  most police officers in the United Kingdom do not routinely carry firearms. The only forces where officers are routinely armed are the Police Service of Northern Ireland, the Ministry of Defence Police, the Civil Nuclear Constabulary, Belfast Harbour Police and the Belfast International Airport Constabulary.

In 2019/20 fiscal year, there were 19,372 police operations throughout England and Wales in which the deployment of firearms was authorised and 6,518 firearms officers, 4.9% of the 132,467 active FTE officers. Following the November 2015 Paris attacks, it was decided to significantly increase the numbers of armed officers, particularly in London.

AFOs can be up-skilled with additional qualifications, such as Armed Response Vehicle Officer (ARVO), Specialist Firearms Officer (SFO), and Counter Terrorist Specialist Firearms Officer (CTSFO), alongside other specialities, including rifles.

Training

The term "authorised firearms officer" became the national standard term for a police officer trained in the use of firearms as a result of reforms in the late 1980s which were prompted by the shooting of Stephen Waldorf. The reforms also standardised the training for armed officers and the rank of an officer who could authorise the issuing of firearms. Armed officers on protection duties, such as those guarding embassies or government buildings or acting as bodyguards for government officials or royalty, were granted a standing authority to carry arms without the need for repeated authorisation.

All police forces in the United Kingdom have an AFO selection process, varying slightly between each force. As with many police specialities, all authorised firearms officers have volunteered for the role. Candidates are required to gain approval from their superiors before embarking on a series of interviews, psychological and physical fitness tests, medical examinations and assessment days, before permission to commence firearms training is given. There is no guarantee of success; candidates can be returned to their previous role at any point in training if they do not meet the required standard.

Once authorised, AFOs must pass regular refresher training and retests in order to maintain their authorisation. Failure to meet the required standards can result in the officer having their firearms authorisation revoked. Health or fitness problems can also result in temporary or permanent suspension from firearms duties.

Use of authorised firearms officers
AFOs are used by some specialist units of police forces throughout the United Kingdom, who by nature of their role have a requirement to deploy armed police officers. Such units include the Diplomatic Protection Group of the Metropolitan Police Service, armed response vehicles in various police forces throughout the UK, in airport policing, and officers of the Ministry of Defence Police and the Civil Nuclear Constabulary.

It is also known that the National Crime Agency makes use of AFOs, notably having an Armed Operations Unit. These officers rarely engage in anti-terror operations, but primarily focus actions on violent, organised crime – including the trafficking of firearms.

Legal status of the use of firearms

The use of firearms by the police is covered by statute (such as the Police and Criminal Evidence Act 1984 and Human Rights Act 1998), policy (such as the Home Office Code of Practice on Police use of Firearms and Less Lethal Weapons and the ACPO Manual of Guidance on Police Use of Firearms) and common law.

AFOs may only carry firearms when authorised by an "appropriate authorising officer". The appropriate authorising officer must be of the rank of inspector or higher. When working at airports, nuclear sites, on protection duties and deployed in armed response vehicles in certain areas, 'standing authority' is granted to carry personal sidearms. All members of the Police Service of Northern Ireland have authority to carry a personal issue handgun as a matter of routine, both on duty and off.

United Kingdom law allows the use of "reasonable force" in order to make an arrest or prevent a crime or to defend oneself. However, if the force used is fatal, then the European Convention of Human Rights only allows "the use of force which is no more than absolutely necessary". Firearms officers may therefore only discharge their weapons "to stop an imminent threat to life".

ACPO policy states that "use" of a firearm includes both pointing it at a person and discharging it (whether accidentally, negligently or on purpose).
As with all use of force in England and Wales, the onus is on the individual officer to justify their actions in court.

Firearms currently used by AFOs

Different police forces in the United Kingdom use different firearms. For forces in England and Wales, guidance is provided from ACPO and the Home Office. Decisions on which weapons will be employed by an individual police force largely rest with the chief constable.

Metropolitan Police
Within the London's Metropolitan Police, there are a number of Operational Command Units (OCUs) that employ AFOs.

 The Belmarsh Firearms Team protects trials at Woolwich Crown Court
 The Territorial Support Group has a small pool of AFOs for assisting other armed officers in the event of a major terror attack.
 The Specialist Crime Directorate arms certain surveillance officers.
 Most detectives in the Flying Squad are armed.
 Special Branch deploys armed officers in its surveillance units, and in A Squad, which protects the Prime Minister and other dignitaries.
 Royalty and Diplomatic Protection, which protects members of the Royal Family and high level government officials, and guards royal property.
 Special Escort Group, which escorts and protects high-risk convoys and VIPs such as the King and the prime minister. SEG officers are armed with Glock 17 pistols and Tasers.
 Parliamentary and Diplomatic Protection, which guards embassies and government buildings. It also provides the armed guards at Parliament to supplement the Palace of Westminster Division, which is unarmed.
 Aviation Security, which protects Heathrow and London City airports. 
 Specialist Firearms Command (SCO19), which provides armed support to the rest of the service, crewing Armed Response Vehicles responding to spontaneous and pre-planned firearms operations.

Number of firearms officers per police force
The number of firearms officers per police force varies on many factors ranging from the force area population covered, force area jurisdiction covered, force area firearm crime rate, sites regarded at higher risk of threat from terrorism (such as governmental or national infrastructure sites for example), and more. As of 2021 the number of firearms officers per police force ranges from a lower end of 37 in North Wales Police to a higher end of 2,469 in the Metropolitan Police for example. Although the figure for the Metropolitan Police is a uniquely high number compared to police forces outside of London due to certain factors such as London being the UK capital and by far the biggest city by population, being the location of the head of the UK government, monarchy and high profile political sites (such as 10 Downing Street, Buckingham Palace and the UK Parliament for example), containing over one hundred foreign embassies, and the fact that the Metropolitan Police carry out specialist national policing functions such as Diplomatic and Royalty protection duties UK wide that all require a substantial amount of firearms officers.

In comparison all other UK police forces number significantly less firearms officers with the next biggest five police firearms units being those of Police Scotland with 530, Thames Valley Police with 240, West Yorkshire Police with 227, Greater Manchester Police with 225, and West Midlands Police with 221. The most common number of firearms officers per UK police forces typically ranges between 40 to 100. However this does not include the Police Service of Northern Ireland where all roughly 7,000 officers there are trained to AFO as standard and carry a Glock 17 sidearm as routine. Though the PSNI does also have in the hundreds of officers trained and equipped to ARVO, SFO and CTSFO standards. Additionally three specialist UK police forces those being the British Transport Police, the Ministry of Defence Police, and the Civil Nuclear Constabulary are not included either. Although to note the BTP is a routinely unarmed police force that maintains its own dedicated firearms unit in the same way as most other police forces in the UK. The other two, the MoD police and the CNC, are however routinely armed police forces with all roughly 3,000 MoD police officers and all roughly 1,500 CNC officers being trained to AFO as standard and carrying the Glock 17 sidearm as routine as well as main primary firearms such as the Heckler and Koch G36, MP7 and MP5.

See also
 Firearms policy in the United Kingdom
 Garda Armed Support Units, Irish version of AFOs

References

External links
 Police Scotland, firearms policing

Police positions in the United Kingdom